The Tender Tale of Cinderella Penguin is a 1981 Canadian animated short by Janet Perlman that comically adapts the tale of Cinderella with penguins. Produced by the National Film Board of Canada, it was nominated for an Academy Award for Best Animated Short Film at the 54th Academy Awards, losing to another animated short from Montreal, Frédéric Back's Crac. The Oscar nomination was the fourth in five years for executive producer Derek Lamb, also Perlman's husband. The film also received a Parents' Choice Award.

Plot
Cinderella has to stay home while her evil stepsisters go to the ball. You know the rest except everyone here is a penguin (even the mice that become the "horses") and the lost slipper is more like a swimming flipper.

Book adaptation
Perlman adapted her film into the 1992 children's book, Cinderella Penguin, published by Kids Can Press of Toronto.

See also

Bully Dance
Why Me?
Crac, the other 1981 Canadian animated short film that eventually won the Oscar

References

External links
Watch The Tender Tale of Cinderella Penguin at NFB.ca

The Tender Tale of Cinderella Penguin on YouTube

1981 films
National Film Board of Canada animated short films
Quebec films
Canadian children's animated films
Animated films without speech
Films based on Charles Perrault's Cinderella
Films based on Cinderella
Animated films about penguins
Films directed by Janet Perlman
1980s animated short films
1981 animated films
1980s Canadian films